Rehor or Řehoř is a Czech given name equivalent to "Gregory", as well as a surname.

As a given name it has a number of diminutive forms and surnames derived from it: Řehořek (:cs:Řehořek, feminine: Řehořková), Řehák, Řehá/Reha.

Notable people with the surname the surname of the following people:
Fred Rehor (1893–1959), American football player 
Grete Rehor (1910–1987), Austrian politician
Jan Řehoř (born 1983), Czech ice hockey forward
Milan Řehoř, Czechoslovak slalom canoeist 
Milan Řehoř (ice hockey) (born 1984), Czech ice hockey goaltender 

Czech-language surnames
Surnames from given names